The Marion Reed Elliott House is a historic house in Prineville, Oregon, United States. Built in 1908, it is the largest and best-preserved Queen Anne style house in Prineville. It is also significant as one of a handful of surviving structures that were built by prominent local contractor Jack Shipp (1858–1942). Marion Elliott (1859–1934), an educator and successful attorney, lived in the house from its construction until his death. Both men's careers benefited from the economic boom that occurred in Prineville in the first decades after railroads began reaching Central Oregon around 1900, the period when the Elliott House was built.

The house was added to the National Register of Historic Places in 1989.

See also
National Register of Historic Places listings in Crook County, Oregon

Notes

References

External links

Images from Oregon Digital Collections, University of Oregon Libraries

1908 establishments in Oregon
Houses completed in 1908
Queen Anne architecture in Oregon
National Register of Historic Places in Crook County, Oregon
Houses on the National Register of Historic Places in Oregon
Prineville, Oregon
Houses in Crook County, Oregon